Nikolai Borisovich Fefilov (1946 – August 30, 1988), known as The Urals Strangler, was a Soviet serial killer. Between 1982 and 1988, he killed 7 women and girls in Sverdlovsk, 6 of which were rape-related.

Biography
After school, Fefilov joined the army and was demobilized in 1966. At the same time, he fell in love with his neighbor, but the girl rejected him. This is suggested as a reason for the subsequent killings. A few years later, Fefilov married, and two daughters were born in the family. He worked as a printer at a publishing house of the "Ural Worker" newspaper. He was constantly in conflict with his wife because he could not get a separate apartment, while the family was forced to live in a communal. On the day Fefilov committed the first murder, another quarrel had occurred in the family.

1982 murder and the Georgy Khabarov case 
Fefilov committed the first murder in a forest belt near the Staro-Moskovsky road, in the area of the Kontrolnaya bus stop in Verkh-Isetsky district, on April 29, 1982. His victim was a 5th grade student of the 41st school named Lena Mangusheva. Fefilov raped her, and then strangled the girl with a pioneer tie, covering the body with branches afterwards. He took the rucksack from the deceased girl, from which he stole a pencil case and two textbooks, and then threw it into the toilet of a gas station.

The body of Mangusheva was discovered the next day. During the investigation of the murder, special attention was paid to the verification of persons previously convicted of sexual offences.

On May 5, according to a Sverdlovsk resident, a 28-year-old intellectually disabled man named Georgy Khabarov who was released in 1970, was responsible for attempted rape, previously convicted for three years for robbery. At the first interrogation, Khabarov said that on April 29, when the murder occurred, he was at home all day. But on May 7, after a series of interrogations, he was forced to confess to the rape and murder of the girl. However, he incorrectly indicated the crime scene, the method of murder (he claimed that he had killed her with a knife), inaccurately described the appearance of the murdered girl, her underwear and the missing rucksack, which was still not found, and often changed his testimony.

On July 17 and 18, acquaintances of Khabarov named Vtoroy and Yenkov were questioned, who said that they had seen him in the vicinity of the murder scene on April 28 or 29, then Yenkov began to assert that he had seen Khabarov on April 29 at 15 o'clock. Full-time rates with Khabarov's witnesses were not held, and the contradictions in date and time were not solved. Other acquaintances and relatives of Khabarov claimed that he came to the village of the 8th kilometer of the Old Moscow Tract, but after April 28 he did not appear there. Khabarov's mother said that on the following day, her son was home all day.

Subsequent examination showed that the blood type of Khabarov coincided with that of the killer, determined from the sperm found on the girl's body. After Fefilov's arrest, a repeated examination indicated that the blood type was identified incorrectly.

Despite the contradictions in testimony and lack of evidence, Khabarov was brought to court. On September 24, 1982, the Sverdlovsk Regional Court found Georgy Khabarov guilty and sentenced him to 14 years imprisonment. He was charged with the rape and murder of Lena Mangusheva, as well as the attempted rape of another victim and the battery of a third.

After the trial, Khabarov wrote a cassation appeal to the Supreme Court of Russia, in which he claimed that on April 29, 1982, he was not near the area of murder, denying the charges of murder and attempted rape, claiming that during the investigation he had been accused of physical and psychological abuse by law enforcement officials. At the same time, the Supreme Court of the RSFSR received a cassation complaint from the mother of Mangusheva, who asked to cancel the conviction and to impose the death penalty on him. To her complaint, she attached a collective letter to the workers of one of the enterprises of Sverdlovsk, demanding that Khabarov be executed. On November 22, 1982, the Judicial Collegium for Criminal Cases of the Supreme Court of the RSFSR considered both cassation complaints. The sentence of the Sverdlovsk Regional Court was canceled, the case was sent for a new consideration from the trial stage to the same court, but in a different composition.

On March 23, 1983, the Sverdlovsk Regional Court convicted Georgy Khabarov of rape and murder against Lena Mangusheva, also incriminating him in other crimes, sentencing him to death. On April 27, 1984, he was executed.

1983 and 1984 murders and Mikhail Titov case. 
At the time when Khabarov was kept on death row, at the "Kontrolnaya" stop, the real maniac committed a new crime. On August 7, 1983, Fefilov raped and strangled with a belt a 22-year-old female student and VIZ worker Gulnara Yakupova, hiding her body in the bushes and her clothes in a raspberry tree near the stadium near the Staro-Moskovsy road. Yakupova had arrived in Sverdlovsk from Bashkiria, so her disappearance was not immediately noticed. The girl's body was found on October 7. After the murder, the killer came to the crime scene three times - on August 30, September 23 and on October 8th or 9th.

On May 11, 1984, not far from where Mangusheva was murdered, Natasha Lapshina, a 5th-grade pupil of the 41st school, became the maniac's next victim. This time, Fefilov not only raped and strangled the girl, but outraged  her corpse by inserting a stick into her genitals. The girl's body was then thrown into a water-filled ditch, and her clothes were scattered around the country road. Fefilov took a case filled with markers from Lapshina's rucksack. Her body was discovered the following day.

During the investigation into the murder of Yakupova, her neighbors in the hostel said that the girl complained about the persistent courtship of Mikhail Titov. At the end of May 1984, he was detained for harassing girls on the street. It later turned out that he was registered to a psychoneurological dispensary.

Soon, Titov was forced to confess to the murders of Yakupova and Lapshina. He constantly changed testimony, could not show where the crime scene was and answer where he put the stolen items of the deceased. But the investigators did not take these things into account. There was a witness who claimed that she had seen Titov on the day of the murder near the crime scene, but it later turned out that she was registered in the city's psychiatric hospital.

One and a half months after the arrest, Titov, who had received numerous injuries, was admitted to the prison hospital where he later died. For this incident, the head of the prison was removed from his post. The murder cases of Yakupova and Lapshina were closed due to the death of the accused.

1985 murder and Ivan Antropov case 
On May 6, 1985, on the lakeside of the Staro-Moskovsky road, Fefilov raped and strangled a 21-year-old art and technical school student named Larisa Dyachuk. He then proceeded to abuse her corpse, again, inserting a stick into her genitalia. The girl's clothes and items were then scattered around the crime scene. Fefilov did not hide the body, but took the ring, medallion, wristwatch and medical scalpel from the victim. Her corpse was found on May 17.

A month later, the two underage Yashkin brothers, who were forced to confess to Dyachuk's murder, were detained and named two of their acquaintances as accomplices. The Yashkins were kept under arrest until the autumn of 1985, but they failed to prove their involvement in the murder.

Then, on suspicion of the same murder, Ivan Antropov, a fireman from the forestry enterprise, was arrested. Paint was found on his jacket, which, according to experts' opinions, was identical to that found among Dyachuk's things. Re-examination established that the paint on Antropov's jacket and the colors of the murdered girl did not have a common genetic basis.

Despite the absence of evidence to his guilt, Antropov's case was twice brought to court and returned for further investigation. Ivan Antropov was under arrest for ten months in a pre-trial detention center until the next year, when the real maniac committed a new murder.

1986 murder and the maniac version 
On May 26, 1986, near the stadium near the Staro-Moskovsky tract, Fefilov raped and strangled a student of the Ural State Medical University, Olga Timofeeva. As in the previous two cases, the maniac outraged the corpse, inserting a stick into the genitals, but also cutting off her breasts. He then covered the body with some branches, taking a wristwatch, gold ring with a stone and sports trousers from the victim. Timofeeva's body was found two days later.

At this time, the senior security officer of the Sverdlovsk Police Department Yuri Kokovikhin turned his attention to the similarity of the ongoing killings in the area of the "Kontrolnaya" bus stop in the Verkh-Isetsky district. In the Verkh-Isetsky District Department of Internal Affairs, criminal cases from recent years were checked. While examining them, Kokovikhin concluded that the killings were committed by one person, of which he wrote a report on and sent to the leadership of the Department of Internal Affairs. He proposed the creation of a single operational-investigative group to search for the criminal, but his version  did not find support among colleagues.

After the murder of Olga Timofeeva, considerable forces were thrown in to search for the criminal. All seven Sverdlovsk ROVDs allocated a certain number of employees daily in operational investigations. Police outfits patrolled and ambushed around the Kontrolnaya bus stop. Old criminal cases were reviewed and psychoneurological dispensaries were checked.

But the actions of the police and prosecutors did not have a clear plan. Kokovikhin's version was still rejected. A theory was proposed that Kokovikhin himself committed the murders in an effort to prove that he's right. His independent actions caused great dissatisfaction with the leadership and he was removed from the investigation, and subsequently dismissed from the police force.

The Svedlovsk Regional Party Committee demanded the immediate arrest of the killer. The father of the aforementioned Yashkin brothers, who was arrested for forging documents, was forced to write a confession, but then refuted his testimony. His guilt could not be proven.

1987 murder 
The measures taken during the search for the killer forced Fefilov to change his hunting grounds: he stopped killing at the Kontrolnaya bus stop, and instead moved to other areas in the city.

The next crime was committed in the Zheleznodorozhny District. On May 22, 1987, not far from the VIZ train station, Fefilov raped and strangled 19-year-old Elena Kook with a belt. He then abused her corpse, inserted a stick into the girl's genitals and cut off her breasts. He then threw her body into the bushes near the railway embankment, where it was found the next day.

Three people were arrested - the mentally challenged Galiyev, Karasyov (in 1985 he was suspected of murdering Dyachuk, as it was he who found the body) and the also mentally challenged Vodyankin. Soon, all three confessed to the murder of Elena Kook, with Vodyankin also confessing to the four other murders committed near the Kontrolnaya bus stop.

Arrest, death and aftermath 
The last crime the maniac committed occurred in the Oktyabrsky District. On April 25, 1988, in the Mayakovsky Central Park of Culture and Rest, Fefilov tried to rape and then strangled a young woman. He took a wristwatch, a purse with money, a gold ring and glasses from the deceased. While trying to hide the body, Yevgeny Mordvyanik, a senior lieutenant of the internal service of the Interior Ministry who happened to be near the crime scene, detained him.

On May 7, information about the arrest of the maniac was published in the newspaper Sovetskaya Rossiya. In order to the investigate the murders, investigators for particularly important cases of the Prosecutor's Office of the RSFSR Viktor Pantelei and Vladimir Parshikov flew to Sverdlovsk.

After his arrest, Nikolai Fefilov began confessing to his crimes, including the murder of Mangusheva, for which Georgy Khabarov was convicted and executed. His testimony was confirmed during the investigative experiments, during one of which a portfolio belonging to the murdered girl was found. While searching through Fefilov's apartment and workplace, the printing houses from the "Ural Worker" newspaper found the belongings of the victims, which were later identified by their relatives and friends.

Forensic psychiatric examinations found that Fefilov was sane. The investigation into the murder series hit the reputation of law enforcement agencies of the Sverdlovsk Oblast hard, coupled with the fact that the maniac's trial could turn into a scandal. However, on August 30, Fefilov was strangled by his cellmate in prison. Officially, the cause of the murder was a quarrel, but a theory was proposed that the leadership of the police and the prosecutor's office in Sverdlovsk did not want to see him live long enough to face trial. Investigators from the Prosecutor's Office of the RSFSR investigated the murder, but failed to prove that it was a hit job. On October 25, the criminal case against Nikolai Fefilov was terminated due to the death of the accused.

In 1989, Georgy Khabarov was posthumously rehabilitated from the murder of Lena Mangusheva.

None of the law enforcement officers of Sverdlovsk were prosecuted for initiating fabricated criminal cases against Khabarov and the other detainees. The accused were the victims of the arrest of offending Deputy Chief of the Verkh-Isetsky District Department of Internal Affairs, Col. Shirokov, and the then-deceased criminal investigator Kabanov.

See also
 List of Russian serial killers

References 
 Nikolai Borisovich Fefilov. Detailed criminal investigation.
 In the Urals, in search of a serial maniac, innocent people were pursued and executed, while the offender himself left the court to retaliate.
 Nikolai Fefilov

1946 births
1988 deaths
Male serial killers
Pages with unreviewed translations
Serial killers from Yekaterinburg
People murdered in the Soviet Union
Prisoners who died in Soviet detention
Serial killers murdered in prison custody
Soviet murderers of children
Soviet people who died in prison custody
Soviet rapists
Soviet serial killers